María de Jesús Aguirre Maldonado (born 25 December 1961) is a Mexican lawyer and politician affiliated with the Institutional Revolutionary Party. As of 2014 she served as Deputy of the LIX Legislature of the Mexican Congress representing Nuevo León.

References

1961 births
Living people
Politicians from Tamaulipas
Women members of the Chamber of Deputies (Mexico)
20th-century Mexican lawyers
Members of the Chamber of Deputies (Mexico) for Nuevo León
Institutional Revolutionary Party politicians
Mexican women lawyers
Autonomous University of Nuevo León alumni
Academic staff of the Autonomous University of Nuevo León
Academic staff of the Autonomous University of Coahuila
21st-century Mexican politicians
21st-century Mexican women politicians
Deputies of the LIX Legislature of Mexico
Deputies of the LXI Legislature of Mexico
Deputies of the LXV Legislature of Mexico
21st-century Mexican lawyers